Besa Kokëdhima (born 29 May 1986), also known mononymously as Besa, is an Albanian singer.

Biography 

Kokëdhima was born on 29 May 1986 into an Albanian family in the city of Fier, then part of the People's Socialist Republic and now in  Albania. At the age of 15, she emigrated to the United Kingdom to pursue higher education.

In 2003, Besa released her debut song "Më Beso", which was written by producer Florian Mumajesi and featured the then newly formed Albanian group Produkt 28. The song was awarded "Mikorofoni I Artë" in 2003.

Besa released her debut album which was titled "Besa", in 2006.  The album was written in collaboration with well-known Albanian music industry personalities, including as Dorian Gjoni, Flori Mumajesi, Genti Lako, Andy DJ, and Stine.

Besa has participated in a number of music contests including "Notafest" where she was awarded first prize for the R&B single "Lëshoje Hapin." In 2006, Besa was chosen to represent Albania at the MTV Exit Concert. In 2009, Besa took part in Romanian national selection in the Eurovision Song Contest, and reached the semi-finals of the national selection. Besa competed in Ohrid Fest, where she won Best Performance. Besa has also participated in a number of televised music competitions, including the Albanian television competitions "Kënga Magjike", and Top Fest. In 2010, Besa competed in Top Fest, and won Best Female Singer with her single "Kalorësi i Natës."

In 2009, Besa participated in the Selecţia Naţională in Romania for the Eurovision Song Contest, with the English-language song "Nothin' Gonna Change" and reached the semi-finals.

Since 2010, Besa has released a number of singles and, including the single "Fishekzjarre", in 2012, the single "Burning" in 2013, and "Zemrën Dot Nuk ta Lexoj" in 2014. These singles were commercially successful and well received.

Besa has also published two holiday albums titled "Besa për Festat" and "Ti Je Festa Ime". Besa për Festat consisted of 8 traditional English songs adopted in the Albanian language. The tracks were accompanied by music videos featuring Besa and the National Orchestra. The album also featured a Christmas Version of the song "Tatuazh ne Zemer." The album Ti Je Festa Ime received positive reviews, and one article called the album "one of the most well-received projects of the year".

She also won Kënga Magjike in 2013. Besa was a judge on the Albanian television show The Voice of Albania.

In December 2016 Besa announced she was joining the panel of The Voice of Albania as a judge and coach for the new season. She was voted as Albania's favorite judge later in the series by Top Channel polls.

Besa made her debut in France with her French ballad "En Equilibre" in June 2022. The debut single got positive feedback. "En Equilibre"  is the first of her upcoming debut album in the French Music Industry.

Discography

Albums 
 Besa (2006)
 Evolution (2011)
 Besa për festat (2013)
 Ti je festa ime (2014)

Singles

As lead artist

References 

1986 births
21st-century Albanian women singers
Albanian songwriters
Festivali i Këngës contestants
Kënga Magjike winners
Living people
People from Fier